Football positions may refer to:
American football positions
Association football positions
Australian rules football positions
Rugby league positions
Rugby union positions